Denis Nikisha (born 7 August 1995) is a Kazakh short track speed skater.

References

External links
 Denis Nikisha's profile , from http://www.sochi2014.com ; retrieved 2014-06-14.
 
 

1995 births
Living people
Kazakhstani male short track speed skaters
Olympic short track speed skaters of Kazakhstan
Short track speed skaters at the 2014 Winter Olympics
Short track speed skaters at the 2018 Winter Olympics
Short track speed skaters at the 2022 Winter Olympics
Universiade medalists in short track speed skating
Place of birth missing (living people)
Universiade bronze medalists for Kazakhstan
Competitors at the 2017 Winter Universiade
Competitors at the 2019 Winter Universiade
People from Kostanay
21st-century Kazakhstani people